This article lists notable events from the year 1814 in Russia.

Incumbents
 Monarch – Alexander I

Events

 
 
  
  
 Treaty of Fontainebleau (1814)
 Treaty of Chaumont
 Eight Articles of London

Births

Deaths

References

1814 in Russia
Years of the 19th century in the Russian Empire